Metropolitan Corporate Academy (MCA) was a public high school in Downtown Brooklyn, New York City. It had approximately 400 students, grades 9–12. The principal was Lennel George. It was founded in February 1992 by New York City in partnership with Goldman Sachs.

Classes at MCA were held at a three-story brick building which used to be a Civil War infirmary.

References
Notes

External links

 Metropolitan Corporate Academy website
 nycudl.org
 content.yudu.com
 thegrio.com

Public high schools in Brooklyn
Educational institutions established in 1992
1992 establishments in New York City